Pyrausta ankaratralis is a moth in the family Crambidae. It was described by Hubert Marion and Pierre Viette in 1956. It is found on Madagascar.

References

Moths described in 1956
ankaratralis
Moths of Madagascar